Christoffer Bergman (born 6 October 1989 in Karlstad) is a Swedish motorcycle racer.

Career
As a four-year-old toddler, he got his first motorcycle, a small motocross bike. In 2009 Bergman made his debut as a roadracer and clinched the Swedish Championship in Super Stock 600 the following year. Since then, Christoffer has e.g. won races in Italian and French Super Stock 1000 on four occasions and has been tested driver for Swedish shock absorber manufacturer Öhlins since 2013.

In 2016, he was the replacement for Luke Stapleford after Stapleford and the CIA Landlord Insurance Honda team parted ways. Bergman has previously participated in the FIM Superstock 1000 Cup.

Career statistics

Supersport World Championship

Races by year
(key) (Races in bold indicate pole position; races in italics indicate fastest lap)

References

External links
christofferbergman.se

1989 births
Living people
Swedish motorcycle racers
Supersport World Championship riders
FIM Superstock 1000 Cup riders
Sportspeople from Karlstad